Rawla Mandi Tehsil is one of the 10 tehsils from the Sri Ganganagar district in Rajasthan, India. It was carved out of Gharsana tehsil and given the status of tehsil by CM Vasundhara Raje in 2017. Rawla Mandi Tehsil is the southernmost tehsil in the district of Shri Ganganagar. Its northern border connects with Gharsana tehsil, Chhatargarh, Lunkaransar and Khajuwala. Its southern border connects with tehsils of Bikaner district. Its western border connects with Fort Abbas Tehsil that is the Bahawalnagar district of Pakistani Punjab.
Major Villeges are Rawla Mandi (8PSD-b), Rawla Gaon(10Kd)

References

External links 
 More information about the villages and irrigation of Rawla Mandi tehsil district.  
 Information about schools, teachers, and education.
 Bikaner University 

 Tehsils of Rajasthan